Black Orchids is a Nero Wolfe double mystery by Rex Stout published in 1942 by Farrar & Rinehart, Inc. Stout's first short story collection, the volume is composed of two novellas that had appeared in abridged form in The American Magazine:
 "Black Orchids" (August 1941, abridged as "Death Wears an Orchid")
 "Cordially Invited to Meet Death" (April 1942, abridged as "Invitation to Murder")

Reviews and commentary
 Jacques Barzun and Wendell Hertig Taylor, A Catalogue of Crime — In the first, Wolfe and Archie are in fine form, and murder at a flower show provides a suitable background for Wolfe's talents and predatory instincts.  Archie himself innocently pulls the trigger. The second story is less satisfactory, involving as it does a highly debatable move by the murderer to disarm suspicion.  Besides, too many animals.
 Time, "Murder in May" (June 1, 1942) — Nero Wolfe and his ebullient amanuensis Archie Goodwin are here at top form in two "novellas" — "Black Orchids" and "Cordially Invited to Meet Death." The first concerns a cleverly contrived murder at New York's annual Flower Show. The second features an adroit bit of poisoning in the fantastic Riverdale ménage — and menagerie — of a successful party-arranger for Manhattan society. First-class entertainment.

Publication history
1942, New York: Farrar & Rinehart, May 21, 1942, hardcover
In his limited-edition pamphlet, Collecting Mystery Fiction #9, Rex Stout's Nero Wolfe Part I, Otto Penzler describes the first edition of Black Orchids: "Brick brown cloth, front cover and spine printed with black; rear cover blank. Issued in a brick brown and green pictorial dust wrapper … The first edition has the publisher's monogram logo on the copyright page."
In April 2006, Firsts: The Book Collector's Magazine estimated that the first edition of Black Orchids had a value of between $3,000 and $5,000. The estimate is for a copy in very good to fine condition in a like dustjacket.
1942, Toronto: Oxford University Press, 1942, hardcover
1942, New York: Detective Book Club #5, August 1942, hardcover
1943, London: Collins Crime Club, July 5, 1943, hardcover
1943, New York: Grosset & Dunlap, 1943, hardcover
1945, Cleveland, Ohio: World Publishing Company, a Tower Book, March 1945, hardcover
1946, New York: Avon #95, 1946, paperback
1956, New York: Avon #714, 1956, paperback
1963, New York: Pyramid (Green Door) #R-917, September 1963, paperback
1992, New York: Bantam Crimeline  May 1992, trade paperback
1996, Burlington, Ontario: Durkin Hayes Publishing, DH Audio, "Black Orchids"   December 1996, audio cassette (unabridged, read by Saul Rubinek)
1998, Burlington, Ontario: Durkin Hayes Publishing, DH Audio   August 1998, audio cassette (unabridged, read by David Elias), "Cordially Invited to Meet Death"
2009, New York: Bantam Dell Publishing Group (with The Silent Speaker)  August 25, 2009, trade paperback
2010, New York: Bantam Crimeline  June 30, 2010, e-book

References

External links

1942 short story collections
Nero Wolfe short story collections
Farrar & Rinehart books